The Pennsylvania State Game Lands Number 274 are Pennsylvania State Game Lands in Berks and Lancaster Counties in Pennsylvania in the United States providing hunting, bird watching, and other activities.

Geography
SGL 274 consists of two parcels located in South Heidelberg Township in Berks County and in East Cocalico Township in Lancaster County. The Game Lands is drained by tributaries of Cocalico Creek which flows to Conestoga River, part of the Susquehanna River watershed. Other nearby protected areas include Pennsylvania State Game Lands 46, 220, 225 and the Nolde Forest Environmental Education Center. Nearby communities include the City of Reading, the boroughs of Adamstown, Denver, Mohnton, Sinking Spring, Wyomissing, Wyomissing Hills, and populated places Alleghenyville, Angelica, Birdland, Blainsport, Fritztown, Gouglersville, Highland, Knauers, Mohns Hill, Montello, Montrose, Overbrook, Pennwyn, Reinholds, Shiloh Hills, Spring Dale Heights, Swartzville, Tallowyck, Vera Cruz, Vinemont, Welsh Woods, and West Wyomissing. U.S. Route 222 and Pennsylvania Route 272 pass along the south of SGL 274.

Statistics

See also
 Pennsylvania State Game Lands
 Pennsylvania State Game Lands Number 43, also located in Berks County
 Pennsylvania State Game Lands Number 52, also located in Berks and Lancaster Counties
 Pennsylvania State Game Lands Number 80, also located in Berks County
 Pennsylvania State Game Lands Number 106, also located in Berks County
 Pennsylvania State Game Lands Number 110, also located in Berks County
 Pennsylvania State Game Lands Number 182, also located in Berks County
 Pennsylvania State Game Lands Number 280, also located in Berks County
 Pennsylvania State Game Lands Number 315, also located in Berks County
 Pennsylvania State Game Lands Number 324, also located in Berks County

References

274
Protected areas of Berks County, Pennsylvania
Protected areas of Lancaster County, Pennsylvania